Sergei Aleksandrovich Iromashvili (born January 22, 1963) is a Russian professional football coach.

Iromashvili managed Russian First Division side FC Chkalovets-1936 Novosibirsk from 2005 to 2006.

External links
Profile at Footballfacts.ru

1963 births
Living people
Russian football managers
FC Sibir Novosibirsk managers
Russian sportspeople of Georgian descent